Poludennaya is a rural locality (a village) in Yugo-Kamskoye Rural Settlement, Permsky District, Perm Krai, Russia. The population was 68 as of 2010. There are 24 streets.

Geography 
Poludennaya is located 51 km southwest of Perm (the district's administrative centre) by road. Yugo-Kamsky is the nearest rural locality.

References 

Rural localities in Permsky District